The 1953 International cricket season was from April 1953 to August 1953.

Season overview

June

Australia in England

August

MCC in Netherlands

Netherlands in England

References

1953 in cricket